Editácio Vieira de Andrade (born December 30, 1973), usually known simply as Dimba, is a Brazilian futsal player and footballer who plays as a forward.

Career

Football
He started his professional football career in 1994, playing for Sobradinho. He stayed at the club until 1995, when he was transferred to Brasília. In the same year, he moved to Gama. In 1996, he returned to Sobradinho. In 1997, he signed with Botafogo of Rio de Janeiro. He left the club in the following year, joining América Mineiro. In 1999, he played for Portuguesa and Bahia. In 2000, for the first time in his career, he played at a non-Brazilian team, as he signed with Leça of Portugal. In 2000 and 2001, he returned to Brazil, playing again for Botafogo. In 2002, he returned to Gama. He played for Goiás between 2002 and 2004. In 2004, he played for Saudi Arabian side Al Ittihad. In 2004, he joined the Carioca team Flamengo, where he stayed until the following year when he moved to São Caetano. In 2007, he moved to Brasiliense. In late 2009, was hired by Ceilândia. He played for Legião in 2010, then he retired.

Futsal
After his retirement as a football player, he started a career as a futsal player, scoring two goals in his first game for Peixe Brasília, played on October 6, 2011.

Return to football
He returned to football in 2012 to play for Ceilândia.

Honors

Football honors
In 1997, playing for Botafogo, he won Taça Guanabara, Taça Rio, and Campeonato Carioca. In 1999, playing for Bahia, he won the Campeonato Baiano. In 2003, playing for Goiás, he scored 31 goals during the Campeonato Brasileiro Série A, being the competition's top goalscorer, and, because of this, he won the Placar magazine Golden Boot (Chuteira de Ouro) award.

6ucar - Guia do Segundo Turno do Brasileirão 2005'' - Editora Abril.

Websites

External links
 
 

1973 births
Living people
Brazilian footballers
Brazilian expatriate footballers
Expatriate footballers in Portugal
Expatriate footballers in Saudi Arabia
Association football forwards
Campeonato Brasileiro Série A players
Sobradinho Esporte Clube players
Brasília Futebol Clube players
Sociedade Esportiva do Gama players
Botafogo de Futebol e Regatas players
América Futebol Clube (MG) players
Associação Portuguesa de Desportos players
Leça F.C. players
Esporte Clube Bahia players
Goiás Esporte Clube players
Ittihad FC players
CR Flamengo footballers
Associação Desportiva São Caetano players
Brasiliense Futebol Clube players
Ceilândia Esporte Clube players
Legião Futebol Clube players
Saudi Professional League players
Sportspeople from Federal District (Brazil)